Tension members are structural elements that are subjected to axial tensile forces. Examples of tension members are bracing for buildings and bridges, truss members, and cables in suspended roof systems.

Calculation 

In an axially loaded tension member, the stress is given by:

F = P/A

where P is the magnitude of the load and A is the cross-sectional area.

The stress given by this equation is exact, knowing that the cross section is not adjacent to the point of application of the load nor having holes for bolts or other discontinuities. For example, given an 8 x 11.5 plate that is used as a tension member (section a-a) and is connected to a gusset plate with two 7/8-inch-diameter bolts (section b-b):

The area at section a - a (gross area of the member) is 8 x ½ = 4 in2

However, the area at section b - b (net area) is (8 – 2 x 7/8) x ½ = 3.12 in2

knowing that the higher stress is located at section b - b due to its smaller area.

Design 

To design tension members, it is important to analyse how the member would fail under both yielding (excessive deformation) and fracture, which are considered the limit states. The limit state that produces the smallest design strength is considered the controlling limit state. It also prevents the structure from failure.

Using American Institute of Steel Construction standards, the ultimate load on a structure can be calculated from one of the following combination:

1.4 D

1.2 D + 1.6 L + 0.5 (Lr or S)

1.2 D + 1.6 (Lr or S) + (0.5 L or 0.8 W)

1.2 D + 1.6 W + 0.5 L + 0.5 (Lr or S)

0.9 D + 1.6 W

L= 14

 D… is the dead load or the weight of the structure itself
 L… is the live load which vary for different structures
 S… is the snow load
 W… is the wind load

the central problem of designing a member is to find a cross section for which the required strength doesn't exceed the available strength:

Pu < ¢ Pn   where Pu is the sum of the factored loads.

to prevent yielding

0.90 Fy Ag > Pu

to avoid fracture,

0.75 Fu Ae > Pu

therefore, the design must consider the loads applied to this member, the design forces acting on this member (Mu, Pu, and Vu) and the point where this member would fail.

See also 

 Compression member

References

Arches and vaults